Jahanshah Javid; born March 3, 1962, in Abadan, Iran, is an Iranian American Journalist, and the founder and editor of the online publications iranian.com (1995-2012 and since January 2021) and iroon.com. He is also a translator and researcher for the New York-based Center for Human Rights in Iran (2015-current).

In 1976 he was sent to high school in the U.S. before returning to Iran after graduation in 1980. In 1981 he joined the Islamic Republic News Agency as a translator and worked there until 1989, including three years in IRNA's office in London in 1985-1988. In late 1989 he left Iran and began studying journalism and communication at the University of New Mexico in Albuquerque and later Hunter College in New York where he received his B.A. in Media Studies in 1995.

In July 1995 he began Iranian.com, an online magazine about Iran and Iranians. Later in 2012 he sold his share of Iranian.com and began a new online publication called iroon.com.

In 1998-1999 he was the BBC Persian Service correspondent in Washington, DC.

In December 2020 he signed a contract to repurchase iranian.com and once again became the editor.

He has been living in Cusco, Peru since 2014.

References

External links
Jahanshah Javid: From Iranian.com to Iroon.com
100 second interview with iranian.com editor (in Persian)
Articles by Jahanshah Jvid, Published in Iranian.com

1962 births
Living people
Iranian journalists